George Stanhope, 6th Earl of Chesterfield, PC (23 May 1805 – 1 June 1866), styled Lord Stanhope until 1815, was a British Tory politician, courtier and race horse owner. He served as Master of the Buckhounds under Lord Melbourne from 1834 to 1835.

Background and education
Chesterfield was the son of Philip Stanhope, 5th Earl of Chesterfield, and his wife, Lady Henrietta, daughter of Thomas Thynne, 1st Marquess of Bath, and was educated at Eton and Christ Church, Oxford.

Political career
He succeeded his father in the earldom in 1815 at the age of ten and later took his seat on the Tory benches in the House of Lords. He served briefly in the Tory administration of Sir Robert Peel as Master of the Buckhounds from December 1834 to April 1835 and was sworn of the Privy Council in December 1834.

Horse racing
Lord Chesterfield had a great passion for horse racing and spent most of his early years indulging in that pursuit. Although he had some success on the turf, winning the Oaks twice, his victories were not frequent enough to pay for the large string of horses he had in training or to finance his lifestyle of lavish party-giving and gambling. His racing colours of red cap and jacket with blue sleeves were also carried to victory by Tom Olliver in the 1843 Grand National aboard his horse Vanguard. In 1840, after the success of Crucifix he decided to give up his expensive mode of living and retire to Bretby Hall. He did construct a gallop of two miles to exercise his horses. Many eminent people visited Bretby to try out their horses or for shooting in Bretby Park. Among them were the Earl of Wilton, the Earl of Londesborough, Lord Newport and Sir Henry des Voeux. The best jockeys also came to Bretby.

Family

Lord Chesterfield married the Hon. Anne Elizabeth Weld-Forester in 1830. They had one son and one daughter. Their daughter Lady Evelyn Stanhope (1834–1875) was the first wife of Henry Herbert, 4th Earl of Carnarvon. Lord Chesterfield died in June 1866, aged 61, and was succeeded in the earldom by his only son, George. The Countess of Chesterfield died in July 1885, aged 82. Like her sister Selina, Countess of Bradford, she was an intimate friend of Benjamin Disraeli. After they had both been widowed Disraeli is said to have proposed to her, but she declined on the ground that people over seventy just look foolish when they decide to marry. Some of their friends thought that she refused him because she believed that he cared more for her sister Selina.

References

External links

1805 births
1866 deaths
Members of the Privy Council of the United Kingdom
George
Presidents of the Marylebone Cricket Club
Masters of the Buckhounds
Earls of Chesterfield
Alumni of Christ Church, Oxford
People educated at Eton College